Blackston Junction railway station served the area of Blackston, Falkirk, Scotland, from 1863 to 1963 on the Slamannan Railway.

History 
The station first appeared Bradshaw in January 1863 and was opened by the Monkland Railways. It had a lot of different names; it was known as Blackstone Junction in the Monkland Railways timetable on 1 March 1865, it was renamed from Blackston to Blackston Junction in the 1866 North British Railway timetables, renamed Blackston in Bradshaw in 1890, Blackstone in the 1883 and Blackston in the 1890 editions of the handbook of stations. The handbook leaflet in 1925 amended the name to Blackston Junction in 1925 but it was still known as Blackston in Bradshaw. To the northwest was Blackston Junction Yard and to the southeast was the signal box, which opened in 1892. The station closed to passengers on 1 May 1930 and closed to goods in 1963.

References

External links 

Disused railway stations in Falkirk (council area)
Railway stations in Great Britain opened in 1863
Railway stations in Great Britain closed in 1930
1863 establishments in Scotland
1930 disestablishments in Scotland